Pleas C. "Hub" Miller (born March 24, 1888) was a Negro leagues pitcher for several years before the founding of the first Negro National League. He pitched for the West Baden Sprudels where papers called him "Spitball Miller"  and he pitched for the St. Louis Giants.

References

External links
  and Seamheads

St. Louis Giants players
1888 births
Year of death missing